Farmers and Merchants Bank Building, also known as the Old Eastover Post Office, is a historic multi-purpose commercial building located at Eastover, Richland County, South Carolina. It was built about 1910, and is a two-story, brick and cast-stone building with an angled corner entrance.

It was added to the National Register of Historic Places in 1986.

References

Bank buildings on the National Register of Historic Places in South Carolina
Commercial buildings completed in 1910
Buildings and structures in Richland County, South Carolina
National Register of Historic Places in Richland County, South Carolina